

Rudolf Wulf (12 December 1905 Elmshorn / Schleswig-Holstein – 14 November 1972 Breitbrunn / Bavaria) was a general in the Wehrmacht of Nazi Germany during World War II who commanded the 319th Infantry Division on the island of Guernsey. He was a recipient of the  Knight's Cross of the Iron Cross with Oak Leaves.

Awards and decorations
 Iron Cross (1939)  2nd Class (6 October 1939) & 1st Class (27 June 1941)
 Honour Roll Clasp of the Army (25 May 1944)
 Knight's Cross of the Iron Cross with Oak Leaves
 Knight's Cross on 13 November 1942 as Major and commander of Infanterie-Regiment 422
 556th Oak Leaves on 19 August 1944 as Oberst and commander of Grenadier-Regiment 422

References

Citations

Bibliography

 
 

1905 births
1972 deaths
Major generals of the German Army (Wehrmacht)
Recipients of the Knight's Cross of the Iron Cross with Oak Leaves
German prisoners of war in World War II held by the United Kingdom
People from the Province of Schleswig-Holstein
Military personnel from Schleswig-Holstein
People from Elmshorn
German Army generals of World War II